Daniel Jan Johan Davidsson (born 17 March 1983 in Motala, Sweden) is a former motorcycle speedway rider from Sweden.

Career
Davidsson came to prominence after reaching the World Under 21 final in 2002 and 2004. In between the two finals he signed for his first British team Poole Pirates for the 2003 Elite League speedway season and 2004 Elite League speedway season. The team completed two league and cup doubles during those years, although Davidsson was only really active for them in 2004.

He spent 2005 at Coventry Bees and Peterborough Panthers respectively, and sealed a third league title with Coventry during the 2005 Elite League speedway season. He returned to Poole in 2006 and 2008. He reached three successive Swedish Individual Speedway Championships from 2008 to 2010.

In 2019, he was the team manager of Piraterna in the Elitserien.

Family
His brother, Jonas Davidsson (born 1984), was also a speedway rider, as was his father Jan Davidsson (born 1956).

Career details

World Championships 
 Individual U-21 World Championship
 2002 -  Slaný - 16th place (1 point)
 2004 -  Wrocław - 16th place (1 point)

European Championships 
 Individual European Championship
 ''2007 - 14th place in Semi-Final B
 Individual U-19 European Championship
 2001 -  Pardubice - Bronze medal (13 points)
 2002 -  Daugavpils - 10th place (6 points)

References 

1983 births
Living people
Swedish speedway riders
Poole Pirates riders
People from Motala Municipality
Sportspeople from Östergötland County